Eurasian Geography and Economics is a bimonthly peer-reviewed academic journal covering economic and political geography as well as macroeconomics of the Eurasian continent. It primarily covers geography also publishes interdisciplinary works. In addition to research, it also covers literature review, as well as shorter articles on its Eurasian Pulse portion of the journal. It is published by Taylor & Francis and was established in 1960 as Soviet Geography. It went through a series of name changes: Post-Soviet Geography (1992–1995) and Post-Soviet Geography and Economics (1996–2002) before obtaining its current title in 2002. The journal is edited by Craig Young.

References

External links

Area studies journals
Geography journals
Economics journals
Bimonthly journals
Taylor & Francis academic journals
Publications established in 1960
English-language journals